Epiphania or Epiphaneia was a city in Cilicia Secunda (Cilicia Trachea), in Anatolia.

The city was originally called Oeniandos or Oiniandos, and was located in the area of the northern tip of the Gulf of Iskenderun, on the route from Missis to Antioch. In the 2nd century BC the city was renamed Epiphania, in honour of Antiochus IV Epiphanes, King of Syria from 175 BC to 164 BC.

The city is mentioned in the writings of Ptolemy and Pliny the Elder. Cicero stayed there briefly during his exile. In 66 BC the Roman general Pompey led a campaign against the Mediterranean pirates. After the surrender of the pirates, they were dispersed and many were settled at Epiphania.

Bishopric
According to Gibbon, Saint George was born here, in a fuller's shop , in the late 4th century. Saint Amphion was the earliest known bishop of Epiphania in 325, as a suffragan of the Bishop of Anazarbus. He attended the First Council of Nicaea in 325, and later suffered under the persecutions of Diocletian. 
Hesychius
 Polychronius
Marinus
Nicetus
Basilius
Paul

Today its ruins include the remains of walls, a temple, an acropolis, an aqueduct, and many houses, all built in basalt.
Titular bishopric of the Roman Church
Vartan Hunanian (28 Jan 1675 - 24 Oct 1681) 
Franz Anton von Harrach zu Rorau (21 Nov 1701 - 7 Jan 1702, bishop of Vienna) 
Giovanni Domenico Xiberras,  (1 Oct 1727 - 5 Oct 1751) 
Giovanni Battista Albrici Pellegrini (5 Oct 1751 - 21 Jul 1760, Bishop of Como) 
Tommaso Vespoli  (22 Nov 1762 - 1768 ) 
Johann Nepomuk Augustin von Hornstein zu Hohenstoffen (16 May 1768 - 16 Dec 1805) 
Pierre Feghali (23 Feb 1919 - 20 Jul 1944) 
Pietro Sfair  (11 Mar 1953 - 11 Mar 1960) 
Volodymyr Malanczuk,  (22 Jul 1960 - 29 Sep 1990)

References
Catholic Encyclopedia

History of Hatay Province
Former populated places in Cilicia
Roman towns and cities in Turkey
Populated places of the Byzantine Empire
Populated places in ancient Cilicia
Catholic titular sees in Asia